John White may refer to:

Actors
John White (actor) (born 1981), Canadian actor
John Sylvester White (1919–1988), American actor

Artists and photographers
John White (colonist and artist) (c. 1540–c. 1590), governor of the Roanoke Colony
John White (photographer) (1850–1932), British photographer
John White (South Australian painter) (1854–1943), painter and pharmacist
John H. White (photojournalist) (born 1945), American photographer
John M. White (born 1937), American performance artist, sculptor and painter

Educators
John A. White (born 1939), American professor and University of Arkansas chancellor emeritus 
John F. White (1917–2005), American academic administrator
John T. White (1856–1924), Maryland school administrator; author of proposed alternate lyrics to Maryland state song

Musicians
John White (composer) (born 1936), English musician
John White (singer) (1902–1992), American country music singer, writer on the genre of western music
John Clifford White, Australian composer
John Paul White (born 1972), American singer-songwriter and member of The Civil Wars
John Simon White (1910–2001), American vocal coach and opera director

Politicians

Canada
John White (Conservative MP) (1833–1894), Canadian politician
John White (Frontenac County) (c. 1760–1800), Canadian politician
John White (Liberal MP) (1811–1897), Canadian politician
John White (Nova Scotia politician), Canadian politician
John White (Ontario politician) (1925-1996), provincial cabinet minister
John Franklin White (1873–1961), Conservative member of the Canadian House of Commons

United Kingdom
John White (died 1407), in 1388 MP for Norfolk
John White (fl.1406), MP for Dartmouth (UK Parliament constituency)
John White (fl.1397–1410), MP for Reading (UK Parliament constituency)
John White, Member of the English Parliament for the City of London, 1566–1571
John White (died 1573) of Aldershot, Lord Mayor of London  1563-4
John White (died 1597), MP for Clitheroe
John White (Welsh lawyer) (1590–1645), lawyer and MP for Southwark, 1640–1645
John White (1634–1713), Member of Parliament for Nottinghamshire
John White (1699–1769), Member of Parliament for East Retford
John White (1748–1813), surveyor and builder in Marylebone for the Duke of Portland
John Bazley White (1848–1927), Member of Parliament for Gravesend, 1886–1892
John Baker White (British politician) (1902–1988)
John White (loyalist) (born 1950), convicted murderer, Northern Ireland
Robert John White, known as John White, president of the Ulster Unionist Party and former mayor of Coleraine
John White, 1st Baron Overtoun (1843–1908), Scottish chemical manufacturer, supporter of religious causes, philanthropist and Liberal politician
Sir John White, High Sheriff of Nottinghamshire

United States
John White (Kentucky politician) (1802–1845), speaker of the U.S. House of Representatives
John Barber White (1847–1923), American lumber businessman and politician in Pennsylvania
John D. White (1849–1920), American politician from Kentucky
John Phillip White (1870–1934), president of the United Mine Workers of America
John E. White (1873–1943), American politician in Massachusetts 
John Coyle White (1924–1995), chairman of the U.S. Democratic National Committee
John White (Ohio politician) (born 1946), member of the Ohio House of Representatives
John F. White Jr. (born 1949), Pennsylvania politician
John Hannibal White, South Carolina politician
John L. White, New Jersey politician
John P. White (1937–2017), United States Deputy Secretary of Defense, 1995–1997
John W. White (politician) (1863–1921), American politician from Mississippi

John White (Georgia politician), A Democratic member for the 132nd district of the Georgia House of Representatives

John White (Louisiana politician) (born 1975), Louisiana state superintendent of education since 2012

John White (Maryland politician), U.S. congressional candidate in Maryland
John White (diplomat) (1884–1967), US Ambassador to Haiti, Peru, on List of High Commissioners of the United Kingdom to Barbados
John Baker White (clerk of court) (1794–1862), American military officer, lawyer, court clerk, and civil servant
John Baker White (West Virginia politician) (1868–1944), American military officer, lawyer, and politician in West Virginia
John B. White, Oklahoma politician

Other places
John White (Australian politician) (1942–2020), Australian politician, member of Tasmanian state parliament, 1986–1998
John White (colonial administrator), acting governor of Jamaica, 1691–1692
John White (Irish politician), Irish Farmers' Party / Cumann na nGaedhael politician, TD for Donegal, 1923–1933
John White (New Zealand politician) (1830–1876), New Zealand politician
John White (Queensland politician) (1853–1922), member of the Queensland Legislative Assembly for Musgrave

Scientists and medical professionals
John White (chemist), professor of physical and theoretical chemistry
John White (surgeon) (1756–1832), Surgeon-General of New South Wales
John Graham White (born 1943), co-developed confocal microscopy and mapped the complete nervous system of C. elegans

Religious figures
John White (archdeacon of Meath) (fl. 14321478), Irish priest
John White (bishop) (1510–1560), English bishop
John White (chaplain) (1570–1615), English clergyman
John White (colonist priest) (1575–1648), English Puritan clergyman
John White, alias of Augustine Bradshaw (1575–1618), Benedictine monk
John White (minister) (1867–1951), Moderator of the General Assembly in 1925 and 1929
John White (provost of St Edmundsbury) (1895–1958), Anglican priest
John Chanler White, Episcopal bishop of Springfield
John Hazen White, Episcopal bishop in Indiana

Sportsmen
J. T. White (1920–2005), American football player and coach
Jock White (1897–1986), Scottish footballer, born John White
John White (cricketer, born 1877) (1877-1958), English cricketer
John White (cricketer, born 1855), English cricketer, played as a wicket-keeper
John White (footballer, born 1877) (1877–1958), English footballer
John White (footballer, born 1887) (1887–1950), Australian rules footballer for Richmond
John White (footballer, born 1937) (1937–1964), Scottish international footballer for Falkirk and Tottenham Hotspur
John White (footballer, born 1955), Australian footballer for North Melbourne
John White (footballer, born 1986), English football player
John White (New Zealand footballer), football (soccer) player for New Zealand
John White (rower) (1916–1997), American rower
John White (running back, born 1991), American player of Canadian football
John White (squash player) (born 1973), Scottish squash player
John White (tight end) (born 1935), American football player
John White, Irish steeplechase rider who was first past the post in the void 1993 Grand National
John Henry White (born 1955), Canadian football player

Writers
John White (Christian author) (1924–2002), author of The Archives of Anthropos series
John White (ethnographer) (1826–1891), New Zealand public servant and historian
John Herbert White (1880–1920), co-author of Modern Chess Openings
John Talbot White (1925–1983), British lecturer, naturalist and writer

Others
John White (art historian) (1924–2021), English art historian
John White (jurist) (1911–2007), New Zealand Queen's Counsel
John White (major), native Irish soldier in the American Revolutionary War
John Berry White, British philanthropist and British Army officer
John Campbell White (diplomat) (1884–1967), American diplomat, US ambassador to Haiti and Peru
John Campbell White (United Irishman) (1757–1847), executive member of the Society of United Irishmen 
John Chambers White (c. 1770–1845), Royal Navy admiral
John Claude White, engineer, photographer, author and civil servant in British India
John Griswold White (1845–1928), Cleveland attorney and collector of books about chess, folklore, and Orientalia
John H. White (Medal of Honor), American soldier and Medal of Honor recipient
John H. White Jr., American historian and museum curator
John Tahourdin White, English classical scholar
John W. White (general), United States Air Force general

See also
Jack White (disambiguation)
Jon White (disambiguation)
Jonathan White (disambiguation)
John Whyte (disambiguation)
John Wight (disambiguation)
John Baker White (disambiguation)
John H. White (disambiguation)
White (surname)